Becky Muncy is a musician and an elementary school music teacher in Bedford, Indiana. In addition to teaching music at school, she teaches character education through music.

Muncy has created a character education CD for children titled Blueprints for Life. The CD was produced by Matt Wilder in Nashville, Tennessee. Muncy won a 2005 Children's Music Web Award for her Blueprints CD. Muncy also is a coordinator for Nashville Songwriters Association International NSAI() and has been so for 7 years.

Muncy is a songwriter and has recorded many demo CDs in the past.

External links
BlueprintsForLife.org - Official Website
Official Website
Children's Music Web Awards - 2005 Winners

American children's musicians
Songwriters from Indiana
Living people
People from Bedford, Indiana
Schoolteachers from Indiana
American women educators
Year of birth missing (living people)
21st-century American women